Mikhail Petrov Petrov (6 January 1965 – 1993) was a Bulgarian weightlifter who competed in the 1980s. He won three World and one European championships. He competed for the Yantra Gabrovo club from 1980 to 1990, with the exception of 1985-1986 when he was in CSKA. Blagoi Zilyamov was his personal trainer. Petrov is 7 times champion of Bulgaria - 1985, 1986, 1987 and 1990 for men and 1981, 1982 and 1983 for juniors. His strongest year was 1987 when he became World Champion in Ostrava, European Champion in Reims, he won the World Cup after winning the final tournament in Seoul. He also triumphs with the Danube Cup. For this he was elected by the International Weightlifting Federation for The Best weightlifter in the world for 1987.

He set four world records in the 67.5 kg weight class.

Petrov died unexpectedly in 1993 after not waking from anesthesia.

References 

1965 births
1993 deaths
Bulgarian male weightlifters
World Weightlifting Championships medalists
European Weightlifting Championships medalists
People from Gabrovo
20th-century Bulgarian people